Ravindra Kishore Shahi was a leader of Bharatiya Jan Sangh from Uttar Pradesh. He was leader of the Uttar Pradesh state unit of party from 1974 to 1977. He was a member of the Uttar Pradesh Legislative Assembly from Deoria district. He served as cabinet minister in Ram Naresh Yadav ministry from 1977 to 80.

References

Year of birth missing
Possibly living people
State cabinet ministers of Uttar Pradesh
People from Deoria district
Bharatiya Jana Sangh politicians
Members of the Uttar Pradesh Legislative Assembly
Bharatiya Janata Party politicians from Uttar Pradesh